Ptychopseustis fuscivenalis is a moth in the family Crambidae. It is found in Sri Lanka.

Description
Its wingspan is 18 mm and its color is ochreous. Forewings with veins streaked with brown. An obsolescent bisinuate very oblique leaden-colored antemedial line. Two leaden-colored discocellular specks. A postmedial leaden-colored line very oblique from costa to vein 6, then waved and obsolescent. A marginal dark specks series. Hindwings pale ochreous with dark marginal specks from apex to vein 3.

References

Cybalomiinae
Moths described in 1896